The Conservative Party in Gibraltar is the part of the Conservative Party that operates in the British Overseas Territory of Gibraltar.  It is a branch of the South West Region of the Conservative Party. The party does not field candidates in the local elections in the territory, and so far has only ever stood candidates for the European Parliament constituency of South West England and Gibraltar.

History

Gibraltar was first represented in European Elections in 2004 as part of the South West England constituency.  None of the main Gibraltar political parties ever contested European elections, so voters chose from United Kingdom party lists. The Gibraltar Social Democrats have however endorsed the Conservatives in European and UK Parliamentary elections.

2004
The Conservative Party polled over two-thirds of the Gibraltar vote, with no other party exceeding 10% support. This was to a large part due to the perception that the Labour Government in Britain had "betrayed" Gibraltar by attempting to negotiate a constitutional settlement involving joint sovereignty with Spain.  This arrangement was rejected overwhelmingly by Gibraltarians in the 2002 sovereignty referendum. The Conservatives were perceived as being unequivocal in their support for Gibraltar's continued British status. In addition both the leader of the Conservative Party, Michael Howard, and his deputy, Michael Ancram, flew in to rally support. Before the election the local Conservatives mounted a vigorous campaign.

2009
The Conservatives won with 51% of the votes.

2014
On the previous two occasions Gibraltar has participated in European elections, the Conservative Party had topped the poll. The Liberal Democrats won the popular vote in the territory for the first time.

2019
Consistent with the poor performance of the Conservatives throughout the UK in the 2019 election, the party received just 2.7% of the votes in Gibraltar, moving into fifth place with the Liberal Democrats and the Brexit Party taking the first and second places in the election. Incumbent MEP Ashley Fox lost his seat.

Electoral performance
The below table lists performance in European Parliamentary elections.

MEPs

See also
 Conservative Friends of Gibraltar

Notes

References

External links
 Official site

 
Conservative parties in the United Kingdom
Politics of Gibraltar
Political parties in Gibraltar
Conservative parties in British Overseas Territories